En Thangai is a 1952 Indian Tamil-language film starring M. G. Ramachandran and E. V. Saroja. The film is based on T. S. Natarajan's play of the same name. It was released on 31 May 1952. The film was remade in Hindi as Chhoti Bahen, in Telugu as Aada Paduchu and in Kannada as Onde Balliya Hoogalu.

Plot 
Rajendran, the breadwinner of his family, watches over his young brother, Selvam, a student, his younger sister Meena and their very ill mother, Gunavathi. Karunagaran Pillai, their paternal uncle, robs them of their fortune after the disappearance of the patriarch, and refuses all requests for financial help by Rajendran. On the other hand, Suriyamoorthy, Karunagaran's son, discreetly devotes himself to his cousin, Rajendran, and his family. One evening, during a violent thunderstorm, young Meena loses her eyesight. She then becomes the scapegoat of Selvam's wealthy wife, Rajam, her sister-in-law, who also begins hating Meena. Rajendran, previously unaware of the situation, finally discovers his younger sister's ordeal. Following a heated quarrel, Selvam and Rajam leave the family home, leaving Rajendran totally distraught. Then sadly, their mother dies and, expelled by their uncle, Rajendran and Meena are forced out onto the street.

Their cousin, Suriyamoorthy, runs away from his father to the capital, where he becomes a rickshaw driver and offers temporary accommodation to Rajendran and Meena. Meanwhile, younger brother, Selvam, becomes addicted to horse racing just like his father-in-law, driving his family into financial ruin and neglecting Rajam. After Rajendran manages to reconcile the couple, Rajam dies in a road accident. Karunagaran comes in search of his son, and he too is knocked down by a vehicle. Dying, he gives his permission for Suriyamoorthy to marry Mary, a Christian. As for Rajendran, he is beaten and finally, pushed to his limits, carries his sister into the sea and they both disappear under the waves.

Cast 

Male cast
 M. G. Ramachandran as Rajendran
 P. S. Govindan as Suryamurthi
 P. V. Narasimmabharathi as Selvam
 M. G. Chakrapani as Karunagaram Pillai
 T. R. B. Rao as Veerasami Pillai
 C. S. Pandhiyan as Azhagan
 S. N. Narayanasami as Veeraiyan
 Kottapuli Jayaraman as Chitraguptan
 Master Krishnan as Idiot Boy
 N. Azhwar as Gundu Chetty

Female cast
 Madhuri Devi as Rajam
 V. Susheela as Mary
 S. R. Janaki as Gunavathi
 E. V. Saroja as Meena
 M. N. Rajam as Azhagi

Production 
The pre-production crew at Central Studios, Coimbatore, initially planned to merge the plays Parasakthi by Pavalar Balasundaram and En Thangai by T. S. Natarajan to make a film. However, Natarajan disagreed with the idea; En Thangai was ultimately made as a single film directed by Ch. Narayana Murthy. Thiruchi Loganathan was initially cast as the lead actor; however, after a few scenes were shot, he was removed as Narayana Murthy was not impressed. Unsuccessful attempts were earlier made to have Sivaji Ganesan, who portrayed the role on stage, do the same onscreen. The role ultimately went to M. G. Ramachandran. This movie was produced in competition with Parasakthi, and was released few months earlier than Parasakthi. Both movies turned out to be popular in box office.

Soundtrack 
The music was composed by C. N. Pandurangan. Lyrics were written by Bharathidasan, A. Maruthakasi, Saravanabavananthar, Suratha, Ki. Rajagopal and Narasimman. Singers are P. S. Govindhan and C. S. Pandiyan. Playback singers are A. M. Rajah, T. A. Mothi, M. L. Vasanthakumari, P. Leela, A. P. Komala, A. G. Rathnamala, K. V. Janaki and N. Lalitha.

Reception 
The film was a success in box office. Film historian Randor Guy wrote in 2008 that the film will be "Remembered for its emotion drenched storyline and MGR’s role as a loving brother, considered by critics as one of his best performances ever." The film was remade in Telugu as Na Chellelu (1953) with the same team. It was remade by L. V. Prasad in Hindi as Chhoti Bahen (1959).

References

External links 
 

1950s Tamil-language films
1952 drama films
1952 films
Films directed by Chitrapu Narayana Rao
Indian black-and-white films
Indian drama films
Indian films based on plays
Tamil films remade in other languages
Films scored by C. N. Pandurangan